Oncideres errata is a species of beetle in the family Cerambycidae. It was described by Martins and Galileo in 2009. It is known from Brazil.

References

errata
Beetles described in 2009